Jeanna Fine (born September 29, 1964) is an American former pornographic actress and erotic dancer.

Career 
Adult film actress Barbara Dare remarked how "fine" Jeanna was, which prompted Jeanna to adopt that as her surname. She was romantically involved with fellow pornographic actress Savannah.

Fine began in the adult movie industry as a blonde-haired punk-girl when she was 21 in 1985. She made fifty movies between 1986 and 1989. She re-emerged as a black-haired in 1990. According to Fine's official adult film bio, Fine's adult film career was noted to have several large gaps between performing, such as during the pregnancy and birth of her son.

According to her IAFD page, Fine made her last non-compilation film in 2002.

Fine was inducted in the AVN Hall of Fame in 1997. She is also in the X-Rated Critic's Association's Hall of Fame.

Fine appeared briefly in the film The Boondock Saints, as a dancer working the adult parlor where an attack was made on a mafia character played by fellow adult star Ron Jeremy.

Personal life 
Fine became involved in a long-term relationship with fellow pornographic actress Savannah, who claimed to have fallen deeply in love with Fine. In a 1999 interview following the airing of the E! True Hollywood Story about Savannah's life and death, Fine commented, "We had an ongoing, on-again, off-again, volatile, loving relationship. At that time I was having a lot of problems myself. Between [male porn actor] Sikki Nixx and Savannah pushing and pulling, I pretty much at one point ran away from them both. I couldn't take it any longer. But I feel I left her behind when she needed me most. It's very sad." Their relationship has been described as troubled due to the two women's heroin addiction.

Awards

References

External links

 
 
 

1964 births
American female erotic dancers
American erotic dancers
American pornographic film actresses
Living people
Pornographic film actors from New York (state)
LGBT adult models
LGBT people from New York (state)
21st-century American women